is a railway station in the city of  Mizunami, Gifu Prefecture, Japan, operated by Central Japan Railway Company (JR Tōkai).

Lines

Layout
The station has one ground-level  side platform and one ground-level island platform connected by a footbridge. The station is attended.

Platforms

Adjacent stations

|-
!colspan=5|JR Central

History
Kamado Station was opened on 21 December 1902. On 1 April 1987, it became part of JR Tōkai.

Passenger statistics
In fiscal 2016, the station was used by an average of 295 passengers daily (boarding passengers only).

Surrounding area
Site of Ōkute-juku

See also
 List of Railway Stations in Japan

References

External links

Railway stations in Japan opened in 1902
Railway stations in Gifu Prefecture
Stations of Central Japan Railway Company
Chūō Main Line
Mizunami, Gifu